This is a list of computer software which is made for bioinformatics and is developed under proprietary licenses with articles in Wikipedia.

See also 
 List of sequence alignment software
 List of open-source bioinformatics software
 List of open-source healthcare software
 List of biomedical cybernetics software
 List of freeware health software
 List of molecular graphics systems
 Comparison of software for molecular mechanics modeling

References

External links 
 Free Biology Software – Free Software Directory – Free Software Foundation

Lists of bioinformatics software